Harper School is a public K-12 school in Harper, Oregon, United States. It is the only school in the Harper School District 66.

It includes a dormitory facility.

Academics
In 2008, 86% of the school's seniors received their high school diploma. Of seven students, six graduated, none dropped out, and one received a modified diploma.

See also
 List of boarding schools in the United States

References

High schools in Malheur County, Oregon
Education in Malheur County, Oregon
Public middle schools in Oregon
Public elementary schools in Oregon
Public high schools in Oregon
Public K-12 schools in the United States
Public boarding schools in the United States
Boarding schools in Oregon
School districts in Oregon